Myliddy is a small town in Sri Lanka. It is located within Northern Province. It is described as a "typical Jaffna fishing village." It is located at the mid-part of the Jaffna Peninsula's Northern coast. The town has been under the high security zone since 1990 due to its close proximity to the Jaffna Airport and the Palali military Base. The town was released to the original inhabitants on 3 May 2017, after 27 years. Only less than half has been released up to date (end of 2019). The fishing town or village was famous for its shark fish or சுறா (sura) in Tamil before the Sri Lankan Civil War.

See also
List of towns in Northern Province, Sri Lanka

References

External links

Towns in Jaffna District
Valikamam North DS Division
Fishing communities